Stewart is an extinct town in Pemiscot County, in the U.S. state of Missouri. The GNIS classifies it as a populated place.

A post office called Stewart was established in 1872, and remained in operation until 1914. The community has the name of Robert Stewart, a local sheriff.

References

Ghost towns in Missouri
Former populated places in Pemiscot County, Missouri